Bikuli is a small village in the Kapilvastu Municipality, ward number 10 in the Kapilvastu District of western Nepal. The village was named Bikuli because, there were no water sources (Kulo) for irrigation in that village and hence meaning is without canals. Bikuli was new version of Bekulo ('Be' stands for 'not' and 'Kulo' stands for 'canals').

The village is situated 8 km north of the district Capital city, capital, Taulihawa and 8.5 km north of the Tilaurakot, the proper kapilvastu, where Lord Gautam Buddha is said to have been born and grown up.It is situated in the 11 KM south from the 4 no jeetpur. While this is 12 km south from the East-West Highway of Nepal. This place lies on the bank of the largest man-made Lake of Asia called Jagadishpur taal (lake). The lake also called reservoir, made for the collection of river water for the irrigation of the southern belt of the Kapilvastu District during the dry season. 

More than 70%  people in this village is educated . Many of the people are involved in the civil services . People in this village is  very helpful . The major occupation of the people in this village is agriculture activities.    

Kapilvastu District